The Warrington station group is a small station group of two railway stations in Warrington, England consisting of Bank Quay and Central. The station group is printed on national rail tickets as Warrington Stns.

Stations

Warrington Bank Quay is Warrington's largest and busiest station, located on Parker Street to the south west of the town centre and managed by Avanti West Coast. The station is on the West Coast Main Line, Chester to Manchester and Liverpool and Manchester via Earlstown lines (Liverpool services form a part of the Merseyrail City Line). Bank Quay serves destinations across the UK, including; Preston, Wigan, Scotland, Liverpool, Manchester, Crewe, Birmingham and London. Services are provided by Avanti West Coast, Northern and Transport for Wales.

Warrington Central is located to the north of Midland Way in the Town Centre and is managed by Northern, with other services provided by Northern and East Midlands Railway. The station is located only on the Liverpool and Manchester Line via Liverpool South Parkway. It is served by services to Liverpool, Manchester, Sheffield, Nottingham, East Anglia and Yorkshire.

Connections
Tickets marked as WARRINGTON STNS may be used to exit the railway network at any of the two stations. There are no direct rail services between the stations, any transfer between the stations would require a bus or taxi ride or a 15-minute walk.

External links
Station information for Bank Quay station from National Rail
Station information for Central station from National Rail